Korea's Next Top Model, season 4 (or Do-jeon Supermodel Korea, season 4) is the fourth season of the Korean reality television show in which a number of women compete for the title of Korea's Next Top Model and a chance to start their career in the modelling industry.

This season featured fifteen contestants among its final cast. This season marked the first time in the Top Model franchise where a previously eliminated finalist (Ko Eun-bi from season 2) was allowed to become a regular season finalist once again. It was also the first time a deaf contestant, Seo Young-chae, appeared on the show. The international destinations for the series were Phuket and Las Vegas.

The prizes for this season included: A cash prize of 100,000,000 Korean won, a cover shoot and editorial in W Magazine Korea, a modelling contract with YGKPlus and a modelling contract with NEXT Model Management in New York.

The winner of the competition was 18-year-old Shin Hyun-ji who became one of the most successful contestants from the Top Model Franchise. Runner Up Jung Ho-yeon also achieved a successful career after the series.

Episode Guide

Episode 1

Original airdate: August 15, 2013

The semi-finalists set off for the casting of their lives. After being introduced to the judges that will mentor them throughout the season, the models take part in their first fashion show.
 First eliminated semi-finalists: Park Gwi-ae, Kim Ji-eun, Kang Yi-seul, Jung Jae-kyeong, Park Min-ju, Bae Yoon-yeong, Cho In-hee, Kwon Da-som, Park Bo-mi & Kim Ye-ji

The final test comes in the form of a chess inspired photo shoot. After an emotional series of eliminations, the final fifteen contestants are revealed.
 Second eliminated semi-finalists: Park So-eon, Cho Eun-jin, Park Sun-ha, Jeon Ji-hye & Jeon Eun-hye
 Featured Photographer: Jang Bok-gil

Episode 2
Original airdate: August 22, 2013

 First call-out: Park Shin-ae
 Bottom Three: Ahn Hye-jin, Jung Ho-yeon & Ko Eun-bi
 First Eliminated: Ahn Hye-jin & Ko Eun-bi
 Bottom Two: Cho Eun-saem & Seok Il-myeong
 Second Eliminated: Seok Il-myeong
 Featured Photographer: Jang Bok-gil

Episode 3
Original airdate: August 29, 2013
 First call-out: Park Shin-ae
 Bottom Two: Jung Ho-yeon & Kim Si-won
 Eliminated: Jung Ho-yeon
 Featured Photographer: Kim Young-joon

Episode 4
Original airdate: September 5, 2013
 First call-out: Jung Ha-eun
 Bottom Two: Cho Eun-saem & Ryu Ye-ri
 Eliminated: Cho Eun-saem

Episode 5
Original airdate: September 12, 2013
 Returned: Jung Ho-yeon

 First call-out: Kim Si-won
 Bottom three: Kim Eun-hae, Kim Hye-ah & Seo Young-chae
 Eliminated: Kim Eun-hae & Seo Young-chae

Episode 6
Original airdate: September 19, 2013

This was the recap episode.

Episode 7
Original airdate: September 26, 2013
 First call-out: Park Shin-ae
 Bottom two: Lim Hyun-joo & Ryu Ye-ri
 Eliminated: Ryu Ye-ri

Episode 8
Original airdate: October 3, 2013
 First call-out: Hwang Hyun-joo
 Bottom two: Lim Hyun-joo & Kim Si-won
 Eliminated: Kim Si-won

Episode 9
Original airdate: October 10, 2013
 First call-out: Shin Hyun-ji
 Bottom two: Jung Ho-yeon & Lim Hyun-joo
 Eliminated: Lim Hyun-joo

Episode 10
Original airdate: October 17, 2013
 First call-out: Jung Ho-yeon
 Bottom two: Jung Ha-eun & Park Shin-ae
 Eliminated: Jung Ha-eun

Episode 11
Original airdate: October 24, 2013
 First call-out: Jung Ho-yeon
 Bottom three: Hwang Hyun-joo, Kim Hye-ah & Park Shin-ae
 Eliminated: Kim Hye-ah & Park Shin-ae

Episode 12
Original airdate: October 31, 2013

This was the reunion episode.

Episode 13
Original airdate: November 7, 2013
 Final three: Hwang Hyun-joo, Jung Ho-yeon & Shin Hyun-ji
 Korea's Next Top Model: Shin Hyun-ji

Contestants

(ages stated are at start of contest and use the Korean system of determining age)

Summaries

Call-out order

 The contestant was eliminated
 The contestant won the competition
 In episode 1, the pool of 20 semifinalists was reduced to 15.
 In episode 2 Eun-bi, Ho-yeon & Hye-jin were called in the first elimination, Eun-bi & Hye-jin were Eliminated. Then Eun-saem & Il-myeong were called in the bottom two, where Il-myeong was eliminated
 Episodes 5 and 11 featured double eliminations with the bottom three contestants being in danger of elimination.
 In episode 5, the previously eliminated contestants participated in the challenge. For having performed the best, Ho-yeon was allowed to return to the competition.
 Episode 6 was a recap episode.
 Episode 12 was a reunion episode.

Average  call-out order
Casting call & Episode 13 is not included.

Bottom two/three

 The contestant was eliminated after her first time in the bottom two/three
 The contestant was eliminated after her second time in the bottom two/three
 The contestant was eliminated after her third time in the bottom two/three
 The contestant was eliminated in the final judging and placed as the runner-up

Photo Shoot Guide
 Episode 1 Photo Shoot: Chess Pawns in Simplistic Gowns
 Episode 2 Photo Shoot: Trend Colors in Groups
 Episode 3 Photo Shoot: Armageddon with a Male Model in a Construction site
 Episode 4 Music Video: Going Crazy
 Episode 5 Photo Shoot: Portraying Fairy Tales
 Episode 7 Photo Shoot: Feral Women in the Jungle with a Python
 Episode 8 Photo Shoot: Composite Couples
 Episode 9 Photo Shoot: Film Festival Actresses with Past Winners
 Episode 10 Photo Shoot: High End Fashion with Various Hairstyles
 Episode 11 Photo Shoot: Brides in Las Vegas
 Episode 13 Photo Shoot: W Magazine Covers

Makeovers
 Eun-hae: Chic Bobbed Cut
 Eun-saem: Dyed Short Cut + Bang Fringe
 Ha-eun: Layered Shaggy Hair
 Ho-yeon: Dyed Blond Bang Hair
 Hye-ah: Dyed Wave Hair
 Hyun-ji: Two-Tone Color
 Hyun-joo H.: Side Shaved Hair
 Hyun-joo L.: Extreme Short Cut
 Si-won: Boyish Short Cut
 Shin-ae: Bleached Two-tone Hair
 Ye-ri: Bobbed Bang Hair
 Young-chae: Bobbed Hair

Post Top Model Careers
 Hwang Hyun-joo has been signed with YGKPlus in South Korea and DNA Model Management in New York. She was featured in Vogue Korea, Vogue Girl Korea, Marie Claire Korea, Dazed&Confused Korea, LUXURY, Wedding21, Men's Health Korea, OhBoy!, Editor School and Living Sense magazine. She was also featured in a spread for First Look Korea magazine with Shin Hyun-ji and Jung Ho-yeon, and a campaign for Lucky Chouette.
 Jung Ho-yeon has been signed with ESTeem Models in South Korea and The Society Management in New York. She was featured in Vogue Girl Korea, Nylon Korea, ELLE wedding, Sure, Ceci, Maps, Singles, Dazed, Allure Korea, W and Go Out magazine. She was also featured in a spread for First Look Korea magazine with Shin Hyun-ji and Hwang Hyun-joo, and a campaign for Lucky Chouette. She has been on the cover of Vogue Korea. She has also walked for shows such as  Marc Jacobs, Alberta Ferretti, Fendi, and Louis Vuitton. She also played Kang Sae-byeok in Squid Game.
 Kim Hye-ah has been signed with DCM Models in South Korea. She was featured in W Korea and OhBoy! magazine.
 Kim Si-won has been signed with DCM Models in South Korea.
 Shin Hyun-ji has been signed with IMG Models worldwide. As part of her prize package, she received a cover and spread in W Magazine Korea and a contract for SK-II. She was also featured in a spread for First Look Korea magazine with Jung Ho-yeon and Hwang Hyun-joo. She was featured in magazines American Vogue, British Vogue, Italian Vogue, Vogue China, Vogue Korea, Vogue Australia, Harper's Bazaar Australia, Harper's Bazaar Singapore, and Elle Australia. She has also walked in shows such as 3.1 Phillip Lim, Anna Sui, Burberry, Chanel, Coach, DKNY, Rodarte, Prada, Isabel Marant, Elie Saab, John Galliano, and Miu Miu. She has been in campaigns for Chanel, Calvin Klein, Dolce & Gabbana and Max Mara. She has also been on the cover of Vogue Korea.
 Jung Ha-eun has been featured in Gray's music video "Dangerous", featuring Jay Park.

References 

Korea's Next Top Model
2013 South Korean television seasons